Traeger is an electoral district of the Legislative Assembly in the Australian state of Queensland. It was created in the 2017 redistribution, and was named after Alfred Traeger, inventor of the pedal-powered radio, which was a significant contribution to people living in remote and rural communities in Queensland, such as those within Traeger.

It takes in most of the urbanised portions of the abolished districts of Mount Isa and Dalrymple. It includes the local government areas of Burke, Doomadgee, Carpentaria, Croydon, Etheridge, Charters Towers, Mount Isa, Cloncurry, McKinlay, Richmond and Flinders.

From results of the previous 2015 election, Traeger was estimated to be a safe seat for the Katter's Australian Party with a margin of 16.1%.

Robbie Katter, the last member for Mount Isa and the Queensland leader of Katter's Australian Party, opted to follow most of his constituents into Traeger. He won the seat with an increased majority.

Members for Traeger

Election results

See also
 Electoral districts of Queensland
 Members of the Queensland Legislative Assembly by year
 :Category:Members of the Queensland Legislative Assembly by name

References

Electoral districts of Queensland